"Fly, Robin, Fly" is a song by the German disco group Silver Convention from their debut studio album Save Me (1975). Sylvester Levay and Stephan Prager wrote the song, and the latter produced it. "Fly, Robin, Fly" was released as the third single from Save Me in September 1975, peaking at number one on the United States Billboard Hot 100. Thanks to the success of "Fly, Robin, Fly", Silver Convention became the second German act to have a number one song on the American music charts. The song received a Grammy Award for Best R&B Instrumental Performance in 1976.

"Fly, Robin, Fly" carries the distinction of being a Billboard chart-topper with only six words: the chorus simply repeats "Fly, Robin, fly" three times, with an ending of "Up, up to the sky". During a segment on VH1's 100 Greatest Dance Songs, it was revealed that the original working title was "Run, Rabbit, Run".

Chart and commercial performances
In the United States, it rose to number one on the Billboard Hot 100 in November 1975, staying there for three weeks. It was both preceded and succeeded by "That's the Way (I Like It)" by KC and the Sunshine Band. The single was also number one on the Soul Singles Chart for one week. "Fly, Robin, Fly" also spent three weeks at number one on the Dance/Disco Chart. In Canada, the song also reached the pole position in the charts, hitting number one in the RPM Top Singles Chart on 17 January 1976, knocking the Bay City Rollers' "Saturday Night" from the top slot, managing to keep it for a single week before being replaced by C. W. McCall's "Convoy" a week later.

As of February 1976, the single sold 1.5 million copies in the United States.

Charts

Weekly charts

Year-end charts

All-time charts

Certifications and sales

Uses
In April 2016, students and teachers from Methodist College, a Hong Kong secondary school, produced an educational "campus television" video by introducing four geometry methods in determining the congruence of triangles (SAS, SSS, ASA, AAS; Side-Angle-Side, Side-Side-Side, Angle-Side-Angle, Angle-Angle-Side), through a song playfully naming "RHS" (Right-angle-Hypotenuse-Side, the fifth evidence for proving congruent triangles) which lines to the tune of "Fly, Robin, Fly". Resembling the members of the band, choreographed arm and legs movements are also featured by the Hong Kong students, in order to introduce the mathematical concepts together with the lyrics ("Side angle side, side side side, angle side angle, angle angle side."). The clip has become a viral video which garnered over 800,000 views and over 50,000 "likes" on Facebook within a week, becoming one of the temporary hot topics in Hong Kong during late April, with various online parodies and social  provoked.

See also
List of Billboard Hot 100 number-one singles of 1975
List of Billboard Hot 100 number-ones by European artists
List of Cash Box Top 100 number-one singles of 1975
List of number-one dance singles of 1975 (U.S.)
List of number-one R&B singles of 1975 (U.S.)
List of number-one singles of 1976 (Canada)

References

External links
 by Apartment20, featuring Ramona Wulf

1975 singles
1975 songs
RPM Top Singles number-one singles
Billboard Hot 100 number-one singles
Cashbox number-one singles
Silver Convention songs
Songs with lyrics by Michael Kunze
Songs with music by Sylvester Levay
Disco songs